This is a list of winners of the Primetime Emmy Award for Outstanding Choreography. With the exception of 2013, the award is given at the Creative Arts Emmy Awards ceremony.

Starting in 2019, separate awards are given for scripted programs and reality or variety programs.

Winners and nominations

1950s

1970s

1980s

1990s

2000s

2010s

2020s

Programs with multiple wins

12 wins
 So You Think You Can Dance

4 wins
 Dancing with the Stars

2 wins
 Fame
 Crazy Ex-Girlfriend

Programs with multiple nominations

43 nominations
 So You Think You Can Dance

21 nominations
 Dancing with the Stars

7 nominations
 The Carol Burnett Show

6 nominations
 World of Dance

5 nominations
 Stars on Ice

4 nominations
 Fame
 Zoey's Extraordinary Playlist

3 nominations
 In Living Color
 MADtv
 Max Liebman Spectaculars
 Savage X Fenty Show

2 nominations
 Crazy Ex-Girlfriend
 The Drew Carey Show
 The Jackie Gleason Show
 Malcolm in the Middle
 The Tracey Ullman Show
 Your Hit Parade

Choreographers with multiple wins

4 wins
 Debbie Allen

3 wins
 Tony Charmoli
 Marguerite Derricks
 Derek Hough
 Alan Johnson
 Mia Michaels
 Mandy Moore
 Walter Painter

2 wins
 Paula Abdul
 Kathryn Burns
 Tessandra Chavez
 Tabitha and Napoleon D'umo
 Christopher Dean
 Ron Field
 Sarah Kawahara
 Rob Marshall
 Kenny Ortega
 Michael Peters
 Wade Robson
 Travis Wall

Choreographers with multiple nominations

12 nominations
 Debbie Allen
 Derek Hough

11 nominations
 Mandy Moore

10 nominations
 Travis Wall

8 nominations
 Tony Charmoli

7 nominations
 Ernie Flatt
 Alan Johnson
 Walter Painter

6 nominations
 Lester Wilson

5 nominations
 Christopher Dean
 Anita Mann
 Mia Michaels

4 nominations
 Tessandra Chavez
 Tabitha and Napoleon D'umo
 Marguerite Derricks
 Rob Marshall
 Kenny Ortega
 Michael Seibert
 Fred Tallaksen

3 nominations
 Monie Adamson
 Paula Abdul
 Sandra Bezic
 Ron Field
 Parris Goebel
 Julianne Hough
 Rosie Perez
 Christopher Scott
 Stacey Tookey

2 nominations
 Rod Alexander
 Debra Brown
 Luther Brown
 Cheryl Burke
 Kathryn Burns
 Don Crichton
 Tom Hansen
 Jamie Isley
 Sarah Kawahara
 Jamie King
 Charles Klapow
 Spencer Liff
 Joseph Malone
 Travis Payne
 Vincent Paterson
 Michael Peters
 Wade Robson
 Michael Smuin
 Albert Stephenson
 Bonnie Story
 Sonya Tayeh
 June Taylor
 Paul Taylor
 Twyla Tharp
 Jayne Torvill
 Sergio Trujillo
 Dee Dee Wood

Notes

References 

Choreography awards
Choreography